Arthur Russell Thorndike (6 February 1885 – 7 November 1972) was a British actor and novelist, best known for the Doctor Syn of Romney Marsh novels. Less well-known than his sister Sybil but equally versatile, Russell Thorndike's first love was writing and, after serving in World War I, he devoted himself to it.

Background
He was born in Rochester, Kent, where his father had recently become a canon at the cathedral. He was a student at the King's School, Rochester and at St George's School, Windsor Castle and a chorister of St George's Chapel, an experience he later recounted in his book Children of the Garter (1937). Thorndike married Rosemary Dowson, a daughter of the well-known actress Rosina Filippi, in 1918.

Acting
At his suggestion, both he and Sybil (who once aspired to be a concert pianist) tried acting as a career in 1903. They became students at Ben Greet's Academy and two years later accompanied fellow members of the company on a North American tour, which included New York City. He remained three-and-a-half years with the company, once giving three performances as Hamlet in three different versions of the text on the same day. He also toured in South Africa and Asia.

In 1914 he enlisted. His brother Frank, who once performed on stage, was killed in action. Russell was severely wounded at Gallipoli and discharged. He rejoined Ben Greet's theatre company and his sister at the Old Vic in 1916, where he played in Shakespeare's King John, Richard II, and King Lear. Thorndike also acted with Sybil and her husband, Lewis Casson, in their touring repertory performing melodramas. In 1922 he was applauded for his performance  in the first professional production of Henrik Ibsen's  Peer Gynt  at the Old Vic.

In film, Thorndike's appearances were infrequent. He played Macbeth (1922) in a silent version of the play opposite Sybil's Lady  and also played leads in silent versions of other classic plays, including Scrooge (1923) as Old Ebenezer, and The School for Scandal (1923) as Sir Peter Teazle. He ended his film career in minor priest roles for Laurence Olivier in Hamlet (1948) and Richard III (1955). Although Thorndike appeared on the stage over four decades (including playing his own Dr. Syn character and entertaining audiences as Smee in ten revivals of Peter Pan, including the famous Scala Theatre version where Donald Sinden doubled the roles of Mr Darling and Captain Hook), he felt a deeper fulfilment in writing, which would include the later work The House of Jeffreys.

Writing
Published in the Dymchurch Day of Syn programme from 1985 is an apocryphal biography of Thorndike that indicates it was during the period of touring with Ben Greet's theatre company, that Russell and his sister Sybil came up with the idea of Dr Syn. The story goes, both were with the company in Spartanburg when a man was murdered on the street outside their hotel. The article suggests the corpse lay there for some time while "... his glazed eyes seemed to stare right up into Sybil's bedroom". Sybil was unable to sleep, so she asked Russell to sit up with her. She made a pot of tea while they talked, and the character of Dr Syn was born. As the night went on, "They piled horror on horror's head and after each new horror was invented they took another squint at the corpse to encourage them." Around this time he completed his first novel of romantic adventure on Romney Marsh entitled Doctor Syn: A Tale of the Romney Marsh.

Personal life
Thorndike and his wife had five children: Daniel (1920-2016), an actor; Dickon (1921-2016); Jill (1924-2013); Georgia (born 1927), who married the theatre administrator David Peacock; and Rhona (1929-2016).

He died in 1972, aged 87, and is buried in the churchyard of St Peter and St Paul, Dymchurch, made famous by his Dr Syn novels.

Filmography

Selected writings
 Doctor Syn: A Tale of the Romney Marsh (1915)
 The Slype (1927)
 Jet And Ivory (1934)
 Doctor Syn on the High Seas (1935)
 Doctor Syn Returns (1936)
 Further Adventures of Doctor Syn (1936)
 Courageous Exploits of Doctor Syn (1938)
 Amazing Quest of Doctor Syn (1939)
 Shadow of Doctor Syn (1944)
 Children Of The Garter
 The House Of Jeffreys
 Herod's Peal
 The Vandekkers
 Sybil Thorndike
 The Master Of The Macabre (1946)
 In the Steps of Shakespeare (1950)

References

Keith Swallow, The Book of Syn: Russell Thorndike, Dr. Syn and the Romney Marsh (pub. Edgerton, 2013)

External links

 
 
 
 

1885 births
1972 deaths
People from Rochester, Kent
English male stage actors
20th-century English novelists
English male film actors
20th-century English male actors
Male actors from Kent
People educated at King's School, Rochester
People educated at St George's School, Windsor Castle